The Gabbro Hills are a group of rugged ridges and coastal hills which border the Antarctic  Ross Ice Shelf between Barrett Glacier and Gough Glacier and extend south to Ropebrake Pass. They were so named by the Southern Party of the New Zealand Geological Survey Antarctic Expedition (1963–64) because of the prevalence of gabbro, a dark, plutonic rock, in the area.

References

Mountain ranges of Antarctica
Dufek Coast